Dmytro Rusinov (born 26 February 1990) is a Ukrainian biathlete.

References

External links
 Biathlon.com.ua
 IBU Datacenter

1990 births
Living people
Ukrainian male biathletes
Universiade medalists in biathlon
Universiade gold medalists for Ukraine
Universiade silver medalists for Ukraine
Universiade bronze medalists for Ukraine
Competitors at the 2015 Winter Universiade